Nix is a natural satellite of Pluto, with a diameter of  across its longest dimension. It was discovered along with Pluto's outermost moon Hydra on 15 May 2005 by astronomers using the Hubble Space Telescope, and was named after Nyx, the Greek goddess of the night. Nix is the third moon of Pluto by distance, orbiting between the moons Styx and Kerberos.

Nix was imaged along with Pluto and its other moons by the New Horizons spacecraft as it flew by the Pluto system in July 2015. Images from the New Horizons spacecraft reveal a large reddish area on Nix that is likely an impact crater.

Discovery 

Nix was discovered by researchers of the Pluto Companion Search Team, using the Hubble Space Telescope. The New Horizons team had suspected that Pluto and its moon Charon might be accompanied with other moons, hence they used the Hubble Space Telescope to search for faint moons around Pluto in 2005. Since Nix's brightness is about 5,000 times fainter than Pluto, long exposure images were taken in order to find it.

The discovery images were taken on 15 May 2005 and 18 May 2005. Nix and Hydra were independently discovered by Max J. Mutchler on 15 June 2005 and by Andrew J. Steffl on 15 August 2005. The discoveries were announced on 31 October 2005, after confirmation by precovering archival Hubble images of Pluto from 2002. The two newly announced moons of Pluto were subsequently provisionally designated S/2005 P 1 for Hydra and S/2005 P 2 for Nix. The moons were informally referred to as "P1" and "P2", respectively by the discovery team.

Naming 

The name Nix was approved by the International Astronomical Union (IAU) and was announced on 21 June 2006 along with the naming of Hydra in the IAU Circular 8723. Nix was named after Nyx, the Greek goddess of darkness and night and mother of Charon, the ferryman of Hades in Greek mythology. The two newly named moons were intentionally named that the order of their initials N and H honors the New Horizons mission to Pluto, similarly to how the first two letters of Pluto's name honors Percival Lowell. The original proposal for the naming of Nix was to use the classical spelling Nyx, but to avoid confusion with the asteroid 3908 Nyx, the spelling was changed to Nix, the Egyptian spelling of the name. The adjectival form of the name is Nictian (cf. Russian Никта Nikta).

The names of features on the bodies in the Pluto system are related to mythology and the literature and history of exploration. In particular, the names of features on Nix must be related to deities of the night from literature, mythology, and history.

Origin 

Pluto's smaller moons, including Nix, were thought to have formed from debris ejected from a massive collision between Pluto and another Kuiper belt object, similarly to how the Moon is believed to have formed from debris ejected by a large collision of Earth. The ejecta from the collision would then coalesce into the moons of Pluto. However, the collisional hypothesis cannot explain how Nix maintained its highly reflective surface.

Physical characteristics 

It is the third-largest moon of Pluto, being slightly smaller than Hydra.

Early research appeared to show that the surface of Nix is reddish in color. Contrary to this, other studies show that Nix is spectrally neutral, similar to the small moons of Pluto. The neutral spectrum of Nix signifies that water ice is present on its surface. Nix also appeared to vary in brightness and albedo, or reflectivity. The brightness fluctuations were thought to be caused by areas with different albedos on the surface of Nix.

The reddish area is thought to be a large impact crater where the reddish material was ejected from underneath Nix's water ice layer and deposited on its surface. In this case, Nix would likely have regoliths originating from the impact. Another explanation suggests that the reddish material may have originated from a collision with Nix and another object with a different composition. However, there were no significant color variations on other impact craters on Nix.

The water ice present on the surface of Nix is responsible for its high reflectivity. Trace amounts of frozen methane may be also present on the surface of Nix, and could be responsible for the presence of reddish material, likely tholins, on its surface. In this case, tholins on the surface of Nix may have originated from the reaction of methane with ultraviolet radiation from the Sun. Derived from crater counting data from New Horizons, the age of Nix's surface is estimated to be at least four billion years old.

Rotation 

Nix is not tidally locked and tumbles chaotically similarly to all smaller moons of Pluto; the moon's axial tilt and rotation period vary greatly over short timescales. Due to the chaotic rotation of Nix, it can occasionally flip its entire rotational axis. The varying gravitational influences of Pluto and Charon as they orbit their barycenter causes the chaotic tumbling of Pluto's small moons, including Nix. The chaotic tumbling of Nix is also strengthened by its elongated shape, which creates torques that act on the object. At the time of the New Horizons flyby, Nix was rotating with a period of 43.9 hours retrograde to Pluto's equator with an axial tilt of 132 degrees —  it was rotating backwards in relation to its orbit around Pluto. The rotation rate of Nix had increased by 10 percent since Nix was discovered.

Features

Orbit 

All of Pluto's moons including Nix have very circular orbits that are coplanar to Charon's orbit; the moons of Pluto have very low orbital inclinations to Pluto's equator. The nearly circular and coplanar orbits of Pluto's moons suggest that they may have gone through tidal evolutions since their formation. At the time of the formation of Pluto's smaller moons, Nix may have had a more eccentric orbit around the Pluto-Charon barycenter. The present circular orbit of Nix may have been caused by Charon's tidal damping of the eccentricity of Nix's orbit, through tidal interactions. The mutual tidal interactions of Charon on Nix's orbit would cause Nix to transfer its orbital eccentricity to Charon, thus causing the orbit of Nix to gradually become more circular over time.

Nix has an orbital period of 24.8546 days and its orbit is resonant with other moons of Pluto. Nix is in a 3:2 orbital resonance with Hydra, and a 9:11 resonance with Styx (the ratios represent numbers of orbits completed per unit time; the period ratios are the inverses). As a result of this "Laplace-like" 3-body resonance, it has conjunctions with Styx and Hydra in a 2:3 ratio.

Nix's orbital period is close to a 1:4 orbital resonance with Charon, with a timing discrepancy of 2.8%; there is no active resonance. A hypothesis explaining such a near-resonance is that the resonances originated before the outward migration of Charon following the formation of all five known moons, and is maintained by the periodic local fluctuation of 9 percent in the Pluto–Charon gravitational field strength.

Exploration 

The New Horizons spacecraft visited the Pluto system and photographed Pluto and its moons during its flyby on 14 July 2015. Of Pluto's smaller moons, only Nix and Hydra were imaged at resolutions high enough for surface features to be visible. Enhanced color images from the Ralph MVIC instrument of New Horizons show a reddish region on its surface.

Notes

References

External links 

 Background Information Regarding Our Two Newly Discovered Satellites of Pluto – The discoverers' website
 NASA's Hubble Reveals Possible New Moons Around Pluto – Hubble press release
 Nix In Depth – NASA Solar System Exploration

Moons of Pluto
20050615
Nyx
Moons with a prograde orbit